James Alfred Nash  (27 July 1871 – 24 July 1952), known as Jimmy Nash, was a Reform Party Member of Parliament in New Zealand and a Mayor of Palmerston North.

Biography

Nash was born in 1871 in Foxton to Ann Ellen Webster and Norman Nash.

He won the Palmerston electorate (since renamed the Palmerston North electorate) in the 1918 Palmerston by-election after the death of David Buick, and held it to 1935, when he was defeated by the Labour candidate, Joe Hodgens in a three-person contest involving the town's mayor, Gus Mansford. He was Chairman of Committees in 1935.

In 1935, Nash was awarded the King George V Silver Jubilee Medal. He was appointed a Commander of the Order of the British Empire for public and municipal services in the 1951 New Year Honours. Nash was a prominent Freemason and was appointed past grand master of Lodge Kilwinning, Manawatu, in 1946.

He died at his home in Palmerston North on 24 July 1952, and was buried in Terrace End Cemetery.

References

External links
Robin Hyde on Mr Nash and others in Parliament in 1925

|-

1871 births
1952 deaths
People from Foxton, New Zealand
Mayors of Palmerston North
Members of the New Zealand House of Representatives
Reform Party (New Zealand) MPs
New Zealand MPs for North Island electorates
New Zealand Commanders of the Order of the British Empire
Unsuccessful candidates in the 1938 New Zealand general election
Unsuccessful candidates in the 1935 New Zealand general election
New Zealand Freemasons
Burials at Terrace End Cemetery